Mycobacterium malmoense is a Gram-positive bacterium from the genus Mycobacterium.

Etymology
From the city of Malmö, Sweden where the strain used for the description was isolated from patients.

Description
Gram-positive, nonmotile, acid-fast and coccoid to short rods.
Environmental reservoir: soil and water.

Colony characteristics
Smooth and nonpigmented colonies, growth below the surface of semisolid agar medium after deep inoculation (as seen with M. bovis), 0.9 - 1.7mm in diameter.

Physiology
Growth on inspissated egg medium and oleic acid-albumin agar at a temperature range of 22 °C-37 °C requires over 1 week.
Susceptible to ethambutol, ethionamide, kanamycin and cycloserine.

Differential characteristics
Antigenic structure: seroagglutination demonstrates a single serovar distinct from that of other species.

Pathogenesis
Usually infects young children with cervical lymphadenitis or adults with chronic pulmonary disease, (mostly with previously documented pneumoconiosis).
Rarely causes extrapulmonary diseases and disseminated infections
Biosafety level 2
 The first case of infectious endocarditis by M. malmoense was reported in 2020 in Cali, Colombia. The patient was a 61-year old woman with a history of biological mitral valve replacement due to rheumatic disease, dermatomyositis and rheumatoid arthritis in management with methotrexate, chloroquine, and prednisolone.

Type strain
First isolated from sputum and biopsy specimens with pulmonary disease in Malmö, Sweden.
Strain ATCC 29571 = CCUG 37761 = CIP 105775 = DSM 44163 = JCM 13391 = NCTC 11298.

References

Further reading

External links
Type strain of Mycobacterium malmoense at BacDive -  the Bacterial Diversity Metadatabase

Acid-fast bacilli
malmoense
Bacteria described in 1977